Hushers Run is a stream in the U.S. state of West Virginia.

Hushers Run was named after George Husher, an early settler.

See also
List of rivers of West Virginia

References

Rivers of Ritchie County, West Virginia
Rivers of West Virginia